Mesoptychia is a genus of liverworts belonging to the family Jungermanniaceae.

The species of this genus are found in the Northern Hemisphere.

Species:
 Mesoptychia badensis (Gottsche ex Rabenh.) L.Söderstr. & Váňa 
 Mesoptychia bantriensis (Hook.) L.Söderstr. & Váňa

References

Jungermanniales
Jungermanniales genera